Mark Alan Lemke (born August 13, 1965) is a former Major League Baseball player and current broadcaster. He won the 1995 World Series with the Braves over the Cleveland Indians.

Biography

Early life
Lemke grew up in Whitesboro, New York.  He attended the now closed Sacred Heart Elementary Catholic school in West Utica. Lemke is also a graduate of Notre Dame High School in Utica.

Minor league
Lemke was drafted in the 27th round of the  amateur draft by the Atlanta Braves.  Lemke decided against attending Purdue University and spent the next four years in the Braves' minor league system, spending time with the Gulf Coast League Braves, Anderson Braves, Sumter Braves, Durham Bulls, Greenville Braves, and Richmond Braves.
He made his major league debut on September 17, 1988, when the Braves called him up from AAA when the roster expanded to 40 players. In 1988, Lemke won the Hank Aaron Award as the top offensive player in the Braves' minor league system.  Lemke split time between the minor and major leagues until .

Career
In his 11-year career, Lemke played in 62 postseason games and appeared in four World Series (1991, 1992, 1995, 1996). He won a World Series with the Braves in 1995, and he led all Braves players with a .417 batting average in the 1991 World Series. He also was the last out in the 1996 World Series, when the New York Yankees won their first World Series in 18 years, popping out to Yankee third baseman Charlie Hayes with the count full. Lemke is the all-time record holder for most career plate appearances without being hit by a pitch (3,664).

Boston Red Sox
The sharp fielding Lemke left the Braves after the  season.  On March 26, 1998, he signed as a free agent with the Boston Red Sox.  While trying to turn a double play in a game against the Chicago White Sox on May 19, 1998, Lemke was injured in a collision with baserunner Chad Kreuter.  He suffered a concussion that finished his season and essentially ended his major league career.

Post major leagues
With his big league career over, Lemke decided to chase a dream and, in 1999, signed as a knuckleball pitcher with the New Jersey Jackals an independent Northern League team. Lemke, who also worked as an infield coach during his stint with the Jackals, was 5-1 with a 6.68 earned run average in 1999.  He returned the next season with the Jackals, but was released on June 20, 2000, after being hammered in his first few appearances. In that stint though, he was wild with his knuckleball and threw an independent league record nine wild pitches in successive at bats.

Currently, Lemke hosts the Braves pregame show on the Braves Radio Network with co-hosts Leo Mazzone and Buck Belue on WCNN-AM in Atlanta. Lemke also fills in on radio during spring training and road games during the regular season as color commentator, until 2008 with Pete Van Wieren and presently with Jim Powell

In popular culture

He is credited as the accidental namesake of Homestar Runner cartoon, when a friend of creators Mike and Matt Chapman, of Montreal band member James Huggins, unfamiliar with baseball terminology incorrectly referred to Lemke as the "home star runner" for the Braves.

References

External links

1965 births
Living people
Atlanta Braves announcers
Atlanta Braves players
Boston Red Sox players
Richmond Braves players
Baseball players from New York (state)
Major League Baseball broadcasters
Major League Baseball second basemen
Sportspeople from Utica, New York
New Jersey Jackals players
Anderson Braves players
Durham Bulls players
Gulf Coast Braves players
Greenville Braves players
Sumter Braves players